Adam Feliks Dyczkowski (17 November 1932 – 10 January 2021) was a Polish Roman Catholic bishop.

Dyczkowski was born in Poland and was ordained to the priesthood in 1957. He served as titular bishop of Altava and as auxiliary bishop of the Roman Catholic Archdiocese of Wrocław, Poland, from 1978 to 1992 and as auxiliary bishop of the Roman Catholic Diocese of Legnica in 1992 and 1993. He then served as bishop of the Roman Catholic Diocese of Zielona Góra-Gorzów, Poland, from 1993 to 2007.

Dyczkowski died from COVID-19 on 10 January 2021, during the COVID-19 pandemic in Poland.

References

1932 births
2021 deaths
People from Oświęcim County
Polish Roman Catholic titular bishops
20th-century Roman Catholic bishops in Poland
21st-century Roman Catholic bishops in Poland
Deaths from the COVID-19 pandemic in Poland